Play Dolls is, along with Not Obtain+1, the first full-length album from Japanese rock band 12012. The album was simultaneously released with Not Obtain+1.

Track listing 
Disc One
"Hermit" – 4:51
"My Room Agony" – 5:29
"Wriggle Girls" – 5:06
"Icy ~Cold City~" – 4:24
"With Shallow" – 4:41
"Melancholy" – 3:34
"Cheeky Doll" – 5:33
"Calf Love" – 4:16
"The Swim" – 5:33
"Queer Passion" – 4:20

Disc Two (DVD, Type A only)
"Icy ~Cold City~" (Music Video) – 4:24

Disc Two (CD, Type B only)
"See-Saw"

12012 albums
2006 albums